Sir Charles Hastings Doyle  (10 April 1803 – 19 March 1883) was a British military officer and he was the second Lieutenant Governor of Nova Scotia post Confederation and the first Lieutenant Governor of New Brunswick.

Military career
Born in London, England, the eldest son of Lieutenant-General Sir Charles William Doyle and Sophia Cramer Coghill, he attended the Royal Military College, Sandhurst, and joined the army as an ensign of the 24th (The 2nd Warwickshire) Regiment of Foot on 23 December 1819. He was promoted to the ranks of lieutenant on 27 September 1822 and captain on 16 June 1825. He received a brevet as major on 28 June 1838. Rising through the ranks (Lieutenant Colonel in 1846,), he reached major-general in 1860. He was Colonel of the 70th (Surrey) Regiment of Foot from 1868 to 1870.

After service in the Crimean War, he was stationed in Nova Scotia and, during the American Civil War, resolved the Chesapeake Affair, which took place in Halifax. He then countered the threat of the Fenian Raid on Canada's Maritime Provinces by ending the Campobello Island Raid. By April 1866 the menace of a Fenian invasion of New Brunswick was at its most serious, and Doyle quickly responded to Lieutenant Governor Gordon's request for military aid. On 17 April 1866, he left Halifax with Royal Navy warships carrying over 700 British regulars and proceeded to Passamaquoddy Bay, where the Fenian force was concentrated, under the command of John O'Mahony. This show of British armed might discouraged the Fenians, and the invaders dispersed.

He was appointed the Lieutenant-Governor of New Brunswick in 1867, the first Lieutenant Governor of New Brunswick after Confederation. From 1867 to 1873, he was the second Lieutenant Governor of Nova Scotia post-Confederation. In 1869 he was appointed a Knight Commander of St Michael and St George, and in 1870 he was promoted to lieutenant-general. He became Commander of the British Troops in Canada in 1870 and general officer commanding Southern District in April 1874. He was promoted full general in 1877.

There is a full-length portrait of him by Adolphus Robert Venables in Province House (Nova Scotia). He is the namesake of Port Hastings, Nova Scotia.

See also 
 Military history of Nova Scotia

References

Sources
Hart, H.G. 1841. The New Army List. London.
Paton, G. 1892. Historical Records of the 24th Regiment. London.

|-

|-

|-

|-

1804 births
1883 deaths
Military personnel from London
British Army generals
Knights Commander of the Order of St Michael and St George
Lieutenant Governors of New Brunswick
Lieutenant Governors of Nova Scotia
Governors of the Colony of Nova Scotia
Graduates of the Royal Military College, Sandhurst
British Army personnel of the Crimean War
Military history of Nova Scotia
South Wales Borderers officers